Mile End Farm Mill is a tower mill at Reed, Hertfordshire, England which has been truncated and converted to residential accommodation.

History

The earliest record of Mile End Farm Mill is its appearance on Andrew Bryant's map of Hertfordshire dated 1822. The mill was working until 1890 and was truncated c. 1900. The tower was incorporated into a house in the 1970s.

Description

Mile End Farm Mill was a four storey tower mill. No details of its cap and sails, internal machinery, millstones or whether it was winded by a fantail or not are known.

Millers
William Giffen c. 1850-76
Frederick Giffen 1876-89
Thomas Clayden 1889-90

Reference for above:-

References

External links
Windmill World webpage on Mile End Farm Mill.

Towers completed in 1822
Industrial buildings completed in 1822
Windmills in Hertfordshire
Tower mills in the United Kingdom
Grinding mills in the United Kingdom
1822 establishments in England